Andrés Gabriel Arroyo Dominicci (born June 7, 1995) is a Puerto Rican middle-distance track athlete who specializes in various events. He competed for Puerto Rico at the Central American and Caribbean Junior Championships in Athletics in 2012 and 2014. He also appeared at the 2013 IAAF World Cross Country Championships, where he ran the junior men's race.

High school
Arroyo attended Colonial High School in Orlando, Florida. Before high school, he had aspired to become a baseball player, and in an attempt to improve his speed for baseball, he was rejected by his middle-school's track team. He and his family moved to the continental United States in 2004. A spell of two races in March–April 2013 garnered national attention for Arroyo, who ran 4:04.45 in a 1600-meter race and a 1:47.79 800 meter run at the 2013 Florida Relays. He was only one of six individuals in US high school history to run under 1:48 in the 800 meters.

Collegiate
Arroyo was recruited by University of Florida. He made his debut for the Gators track team on January 11, 2014, running 4:14.61 mile at that year's UAB Invitational in Birmingham, Alabama.

Arroyo qualified for 2016 Summer Olympics running 1:45.78 in 800 metres at 2016 Florida Relays.

References

External links
 

1995 births
Living people
Puerto Rican male middle-distance runners
Puerto Rican male long-distance runners
Florida Gators men's track and field athletes
Sportspeople from Bayamón, Puerto Rico
Track and field athletes from Florida
Athletes (track and field) at the 2016 Summer Olympics
Olympic track and field athletes of Puerto Rico
World Athletics Championships athletes for Puerto Rico
Athletes (track and field) at the 2019 Pan American Games
Pan American Games competitors for Puerto Rico
Colonial High School alumni
Athletes (track and field) at the 2020 Summer Olympics